Anketell is a suburb of Perth, Western Australia, located within the City of Kwinana.

Anketell was part of early settler Thomas Peel's land grant, used for the 1920s Group Settlement Scheme in Peel Estate. It is named after Peel Estate's surveyor, Richard John Anketell.

References

External links

Suburbs of Perth, Western Australia
Suburbs in the City of Kwinana